Canton High School is a secondary school for grades 9–12 located in Canton, Connecticut. Its enrollment is 496  as of 2016. Canton's mascot is the warrior. It is in part known for its music and arts program.

References

External links
 

Canton, Connecticut
Schools in Hartford County, Connecticut
Public high schools in Connecticut
1970 establishments in Connecticut
Educational institutions established in 1970